Akbar Fallah (born 4 September 1966) is an Iranian wrestler. He competed at the 1988 Summer Olympics and the 1996 Summer Olympics.

References

External links
 

1966 births
Living people
Iranian male sport wrestlers
Olympic wrestlers of Iran
Wrestlers at the 1988 Summer Olympics
Wrestlers at the 1996 Summer Olympics
Sportspeople from Tehran
Asian Games bronze medalists for Iran
Asian Games medalists in wrestling
Wrestlers at the 1986 Asian Games
Wrestlers at the 1990 Asian Games
Medalists at the 1986 Asian Games
World Wrestling Championships medalists
20th-century Iranian people
21st-century Iranian people
World Wrestling Champions